The 23rd BRDC International Trophy meeting - formally the GEN/Daily Express BRDC International Trophy - was held on 8 May 1971 at the Silverstone Circuit, England. The race was run to Formula One and Formula 5000 regulations, and was held over two heats of 26 laps each, the final results being an aggregate of the two. Graham Hill emerged the winner in the unique Brabham BT34 lobster-claw car, designed by Ron Tauranac. It would be the two-time World Champion's last victory in a Formula One race. The 1971 event was also notable as one of the few competitive outings for the Lotus 56 gas turbine car. However, suspension failure on only the third lap of the first heat resulted in early retirement for driver Emerson Fittipaldi, although the car held together for long enough to take third place in the second heat.

The race incorporated Round 5 of the 1971 Rothmans European Formula 5000 Championship.

Results

Final aggregate
Note: a blue background indicates a Formula 5000 entrant.

Heats

References

BRDC International Trophy
BRDC International Trophy
Brdc
Formula 5000 race reports